The Early Years is the third compilation album by the Danish rock group D-A-D. The compilation was released on 13 November 2000.
It contains every track from the group's first two albums Call of the Wild and D.A.D. Draws a Circle, their first EP Standin' On the Never Never plus extra material consisting of remixes and radio edits among other things. It peaked at number 40 on the Danish charts on 19 January 2001.

Track listing

CD 1 
Call Of The Wild
  1.  Land Of Their Choice
  2.  Call Of The Wild
  3.  Riding With Sue
  4.  Marlboro Man
  5.  Counting The Cattle
  6.  Jackie O
  7.  Trucker
  8.  Rock River
  9.  Jonnie
 10.  Son Of A Gun
 11. It's After Dark
D.A.D. Draws A Circle
 12.  Isn't That Wild
 13.  A Horse With No Name
 14.  Mighty Highty High
 15.  I Won't Cut My Hair
 16.  Black Crickets
 17.  There's A Ship
 18.  God's Favorite
 19.  10 Knots
 20.  Ride My Train
 21.  Rather Live Than Die

CD 2 
Standin' On The Never Never
  1. Up, Up Over The Mountain Top
  2. Marlboro Man
  3. Never Never (Indian Love)
Extra material
  4. Ride My Train (2000 Remix)
  5. It's After Dark (video version)
  6. Trucker (2000 remix single version/radio edit)
  7. Trucker (2000 remix club version)
  8. Trucker (1987 New York remix)
  9. Trucker (1987 jab dub)
 10. There's A Ship (The 1987 megamix)
 11. Rin Tin Tin (demo)
 12. It's A Sad Sad X-mas (single version)
 13. The Danish Radio 1987/88 New year's jingle 1: "The Party"
 14. The Danish Radio 1987/88 New year's jingle 2: "From Us To You"
 15. The Danish Radio 1987/88 New year's jingle 3: "Fireworks"
 16. Land Of Their Choice (live 1985)
 17. Radio Voice interview: "The Whopper End"

References

External links 
This album on D-A-D's official homepage

2000 albums
D.A.D. (band) albums